Paul Armstrong may refer to:

 Paul Armstrong (Irish footballer) (born 1978), Irish football midfielder
 Paul Armstrong (Scottish footballer) (born 1965), Scottish football forward 
 Paul Armstrong (Australian footballer) (born 1957), Australian rules football player and administrator
 Curly Armstrong (1918–1983), American basketball player and coach